Rabun is a 2003 Malaysian drama film directed by Yasmin Ahmad. It tells a story about a free-spirited older couple, Pak Atan and Mak Inom who decide to spend more time in the country after getting tired of city life. But they find that life in the old village isn't a good thing when they get cheated by a distant relative, Yem, out of some money. They cut him off and Yem plots revenge. Meanwhile, in the city, the couple's daughter Orked is being wooed by a young gentleman, Yasin. Rabun is Yasmin Ahmad's first film before her other films, Sepet, Gubra, Mukhsin, Muallaf and Talentime.

Premise
The story revolves on Orked who lives with her parents, Pak Atan and Mak Inom and having a feast between them.

References

External links
 

2003 films
2003 television films
2003 drama films
Films directed by Yasmin Ahmad
Malaysian drama films
Malay-language films
Chinese-language Malaysian films
Cantonese-language Malaysian films
2003 directorial debut films
2000s English-language films